Hormead is a civil parish in Hertfordshire, England. It comprises the villages of Great Hormead and Little Hormead and the hamlet of Hare Street and lies in the East Hertfordshire district. Hare Street House is located within Hare Street. In 2011 it had a population of 743.

History 
The parish was formed on 1 April 1937 from "Great Hormead", "Little Hormead" and parts of Braughing and Layston.

See also

 The Hundred Parishes

References 

Civil parishes in Hertfordshire
East Hertfordshire District